The 1956 Washington gubernatorial election took place on November 6, 1956, between Democratic state senator Albert Rosellini and Republican lieutenant governor Emmett T. Anderson.

Rosellini defeated Anderson during the general election, becoming the first Italian American to lead a U.S. state west of the Mississippi River. Incumbent Republican governor Arthur B. Langlie declined to run for a fourth term, instead challenging Warren Magnuson for a U.S. Senate seat.

Primary election

Incumbent governor Arthur B. Langlie, a Republican who had served three terms, announced on May 2 that he would not run for a fourth term and instead challenge Warren Magnuson for one of the state's U.S. Senate seats. Langlie made no public endorsement for a Republican candidate, but privately supported congressman Thor C. Tollefson prior to the announcement. Tollefson would later drop out of the gubernatorial race by the end of the month and pursue another congressional term, leaving Lieutenant Governor Emmett T. Anderson and Attorney General Don Eastvold as the remaining Republican frontrunners.

Albert D. Rosellini, a Democratic state senator from South Seattle, announced his candidacy on May 24, proposing a state department of commerce, industrial regulations, diversification of jobs and industries, a second Lake Washington bridge, and toll-free superhighways. Rosellini, a New Deal liberal Democrat who had been named leader of the state's Democratic Senate Caucus, publicly opposed Langlie during his three terms as governors and often butted heads with the former Seattle mayor. After missteps during his 1952 bid for governor, Rosellini was left to run in the 1956 race using his own funds.

State Secretary of State Earl Coe, another Democrat, joined the race in early July and became Rosellini's biggest challenger for the Democratic nomination. By the filing deadline in July, the field of candidates grew to nine, with Democratic state senator Roderick A. Lindsay of Spokane joining the race. Prior to the primary, Anderson emerged as a Republican favorite among former Langlie supporters, while Democrats Coe and Rosellini were expected to split a contentious vote.

During the September 11 blanket primary, Rosellini and Anderson won the right to advance to the general election, with comfortable margins in early returns. Coe formally endorsed Rosellini on September 26, citing a preference to avoid "past stalemates" and encouraging voters to give majority control of the legislature to the Democrats.

Candidates

Democratic Party
Earl Coe, secretary of state
John C. Edwards
Roderick Lindsay, state senator from Spokane
Albert D. Rosellini, state senator from South Seattle and candidate for governor in 1952

Republican Party
Emmett T. Anderson, lieutenant governor
Ralph E. Bohnke
Roy DeGrief
Don Eastvold
Thomas C. Hall
John E. Lydon

Primary election results

General election

Henry Killman was nominated by the Socialist Labor Party of America in September and approved by the Secretary of State as the only minor party in the governor's race.

Rosellini spent much of his campaigning proposing improvements to the state's institutions, including prisons and schools, while attacking the Langlie administration. Anderson, by contrast, made few promises and touted his qualifications as lieutenant governor.

On November 6, Rosellini won the governorship and promised to promote bipartisanship and select state employees on merit rather than political qualifications. Anderson formally conceded to Rosellini the following morning, congratulating him on his victory and thanking his supporters.

General election results

References

External links
Washington voters elect Albert Rosellini governor and re-elect Warren Magnuson to the United States Senate on November 6, 1956. at HistoryLink

Washington
1956
Gubernatorial
November 1956 events in the United States